Top Dog is a 1995 buddy cop action comedy film directed by Aaron Norris and starring Chuck Norris. Written by Aaron Norris and Tim Grayem, it was Norris' last film to release theatrically before he shifted to direct-to-video films for several years.

In the film, Norris' character, Jake Wilder, is partnered with Reno, a police dog, whose handler was killed. Jake and Reno investigate a plot by domestic terrorists to attack a conference on unity. Jake and Reno survive assassination attempts and several hand-to-hand fights with the terrorists and eventually discover enough clues to foil the attack. The film is set in San Diego and was largely filmed there.

The film received mainly negative reviews, and its box office was negatively impacted by the timing of its release, only 9 days after the Oklahoma City bombing.

Plot
The film opens as two white nationalists destroy an apartment complex in which most of the residents are minorities. Veteran police officer, Sgt. Lou Swanson, and his police dog, Reno, investigate the crime and realize the explosives are military in style. Their investigation takes them to the harbor, where they find a ship loaded with weapons. They are discovered and shot. Lou dies, but Reno survives.

Maverick cop Jake Wilder (Chuck Norris), is called by police captain Ken Callahan (Clyde Kusatsu), who requests Jake to take over the case. Jake is angered that he has to work with Reno, despite Reno proving himself capable through a battle training scenario.

Meanwhile, Neo-Nazis are trying to smuggle weapons across the border from Mexico. It is implied that they murdered their Mexican arms dealers. They are stopped by the Border Patrol and try to escape, but their car is destroyed in the process.

Jake and Reno survive an assassination attempt at Jake's home. Afterwards, Jake is visiting his mother, who reveals that Adolf Hitler's birthday will be the following day. Jake realizes this a clue, and takes off running. The police department works with the sheriff's office, as well as the FBI in determining where the Neo-Nazis are going to hit. One officer reveals that on Hitler's birthday (April 20), the Pope, and several other of his esteemed bishops will host the Coalition for Racial Unity.

As the Neo-Nazis hitmen are practicing for their attack, the leaders are revealed not to be just one white supremacist group, but an alliance of several including the Ku Klux Klan, the Aryan Nations, and the Church of the Creator. They plan to use their attack on the Coalition for Racial Unity as an opportunity to unite all the Neo-Nazi groups in the US, as well as the world.

Jake discovers the location of the warehouse where the Neo-Nazis are located. He and Reno go undercover and manage to steal a piece of evidence that could be used to convict the Neo-Nazi leaders. They are discovered and Jake orders Reno to flee with the evidence. Wilder subdues several radicals during the following fight, however he is finally captured, after a dozen attackers confront him at all once, and he is then hit on the head with a blunt object. He wakes up to find that he is tied up and the Neo-Nazi plan is now under way. Reno finds Jake, and eats away his rope bindings, just before a Neo-Nazi has the chance to kill him. Jake is able to call the police chief and tells him that the plan is in motion.

The police, FBI, CTU, and Sheriff's Department arrive as the Coalition for Racial Unity is attacked and in a gun battle many Neo-Nazis are killed. The Pope and his Bishops get in their bulletproof car, but it is rigged to explode. Wilder defuses the bomb, while Reno goes after the Neo-Nazi leader. Wilder chases after him as well, and after a vicious fight, manages to subdue him. Reno is set to attack the Neo-Nazi leader, who confesses to killing Reno's former veteran cop owner. Just before Reno can attack the leader, Lou's grandson, Matthew, arrives to stop him.

Cast 
 Chuck Norris as Lt. Jake Wilder
 Michele Lamar Richards as Det. Savannah Boyette
 Erik von Detten as Matthew Swanson
 Carmine Caridi as Sgt. Lou Swanson
 Clyde Kusatsu as Capt. Ken Callahan
 Kai Wulff as Otto Dietrich
 Peter Savard Moore as Karl Koller
 Timothy Bottoms as Nelson Houseman
 Francesco Quinn as Mark Curtains
 Herta Ware as Mrs. Wilder
 John Kerry as Cmdr. West
 Hank Baumert as Border Patrol Officer
 Linda Castro as Paramedic
 John Sistrunk as Driver at border
 Bob Bastanchury as Passenger

Production
Shooting took place in San Diego. When the filmmakers wanted to shoot in a residential area of Point Loma, they solicited support from residents by inviting them to the shoot.

Release and reception

Top Dog was released only 9 days after the Oklahoma City bombing. Because the film's plot deals with terrorism, the poor timing of the film's release was noted in multiple reviews and articles. The film debuted at number eight.

Rotten Tomatoes reports that 0% of eight surveyed critics gave the film a positive review; the average rating is 1.8/10. The film was criticised for being too similar to K-9 and Turner & Hooch.

See also
 Chuck Norris filmography
 List of American films of 1995
 List of media set in San Diego

References

External links
 
 
 

1995 films
1990s police comedy films
1990s buddy cop films
1990s buddy comedy films
American action comedy films
American buddy comedy films
American buddy cop films
Artisan Entertainment films
American police detective films
1995 action comedy films
Films about dogs
Films shot in San Diego
Films set in San Diego
Films directed by Aaron Norris
Films about racism
Films about terrorism
Films about the Ku Klux Klan
Oklahoma City bombing
1995 comedy films
Police dogs in fiction
1990s English-language films
1990s American films
Films scored by George S. Clinton